Umvoti Commando was a Commando unit of the South African Army. It formed part of the South African Army Infantry Formation as well as the South African Territorial Reserve.

History

Origin

Rifle Association
The forerunner of Umvoti Commando was a unit raised in 1949 in the Greytown district as sub unit of the Zululand Skiet Kommando under command of Captain A.W. Rossouw.

Operations

With the UDF
Umvoti Commando was named on 5 August 1952 after a requirement to split from the Zululand Skiet Kommando was approved.

With the SADF
The unit was stationed in Greytown since its beginning and moved to a purpose built HQ in 1978.

Area of responsibility
The unit was responsible for Umvoti, Kranskop, New Hannover and Msinga magisterial districts.

National Colours
The unit was awarded its National Colours on 29 June 1991.

With the SANDF

Disbandment
This unit, along with all other Commando units was disbanded after a decision by South African President Thabo Mbeki to disband all Commando Units. The Commando system was phased out between 2003 and 2008 "because of the role it played in the apartheid era", according to the Minister of Safety and Security Charles Nqakula.

Unit Insignia

Leadership
 Cmdt J.F. van Rooyen 1952-1963
 Cmdt W.G. Redinger 1963-1966
 Cmdt K. du Preez 1966-1967
 Cmdt J. van Rooyen 1967-1969
 Cmdt J Menne 1969-1971
 Cmdt W.G. Redinger 1971-1978
 Cmdt G.E. Lauterbach 1978-1988
 Cmdt W.W. Fourie 1988-

References

Military units and formations disestablished in the 1990s
South African Commando Units